Hampton Hall may refer to:

 Hampton Hall (Franklin, Kentucky), listed on the NRHP in Simpson County, Kentucky
 Hampton Hall (Woodville, Mississippi), listed on the NRHP in Wilkinson County, Mississippi
 Hampton Old Hall, Cheshire, England
 Hampton Hall, Worthen, Shropshire, England

See also
Hampton House (disambiguation)

Architectural disambiguation pages